The following is a list of stadiums at which rugby union is played, ordered by seating capacity. Currently all stadiums with a capacity of 10,000 or more which are the regular home venue of a club or national team, or are the regular hosts of a major competition (such as an event in the World Rugby Sevens Series, its women's version, or the final of an annual national competition), are included. Stadiums for which the only rugby union use is hosting occasional matches or which have only hosted one-off rugby union tournaments are not included. Not all of these stadiums are primarily venues for rugby union, with some being primarily venues for another sport.

Current stadiums

Closed or demolished stadiums

Future stadiums
This list includes stadiums that are either under construction or planned.

1 As a Rugby ground.

See also

 List of Australian rugby union stadiums by capacity
 List of English rugby union stadiums by capacity
 List of rugby union stadiums in France
 List of Super Rugby stadiums
 List of rugby league stadiums by capacity

References

External links

Lists of stadiums
 
Stadiums
Lists of sports venues with capacity